Mark W. Williams (May 31, 1925 – October 25, 2013) was a United States infantryman who fought in Belgium and Holland. He was wounded twice and spent time in London hospitals. In the occupation forces, he played football in a number of Germany's stadia. After a successful business career, he reentered sports to be an American football coach at the college level, and was later an associate professor of Business Administration at Carroll University.

Williams played college football at Hobart College in Geneva, New York.  He also was able to complete two separate tryouts for the upstart "old" Baltimore Colts but did not make the professional team. He coached kids' football teams in Glen Ellyn, Illinois and eventually became a defensive line coach for the Joliet Chargers. Williams graduated from Hobart in 1949 and then went on to study sociology at New York University until 1951 and later completed a Masters of Business Administration from the University of Wisconsin–Madison.

College Coaching career 
After leaving a successful career in business  Williams took a significant pay cut with a major change in personal lifestyle to become a collegiate head football coach, making nationwide headlines.

Williams became the 25th head football coach at Carroll College (now called Carroll University) in Waukesha, Wisconsin and he held that position for four seasons, from 1978 until 1981.  His career coaching record at Carroll College was 12–24.  This ranks him tenth at Carroll College in total wins and 20th at Carroll College in winning percentage.

Death
Williams died at his home on October 25, 2013.

Head coaching record

References

1925 births
2013 deaths
American football ends
Carroll Pioneers football coaches
Carroll University faculty
Hobart Statesmen football players
United States Army personnel of World War II
United States Army Rangers
New York University alumni
Wisconsin School of Business alumni
People from West Hartford, Connecticut